Zarya is a rural locality (a village) in Bik-Karmalinsky Selsoviet, Davlekanovsky District, Bashkortostan, Russia. The population was 65 as of 2010. There are 2 streets.

Geography 
Zarya is located 24 km southeast of Davlekanovo (the district's administrative centre) by road. Bik-Karmaly is the nearest rural locality.

References 

Rural localities in Davlekanovsky District